Lealands High School, formerly Sundon Park Comprehensive School, is a foundation school for 11 to 16 year olds located in Sundon Park, Luton. The school attracts students from Sundon Park and across Luton and Bedfordshire.  It was judged good with outstanding behaviour and safety by Ofsted in 2013 and confirmed to continue being a good school overall in March 2017 following a short inspection by Ofsted.  In 2014 the school was placed in the top 100 most improved secondary schools for GCSE results including English and maths over a sustained period. Main feeder schools include Sundon Park Juniors School, Leagrave Primary and Pirton Hill, although students join Lealands from primary schools across Luton and the surrounding areas.

Specialism 
As of September 2006, the school was awarded 'Specialist Sports College' status. This was part of a nationwide plan spearheaded by the Department of Education to raise standards in education. The school has seen various improvements in its facilities since being awarded the status. The specialist school programme has now ended, but Lealands High School continues to offer sport as a specialism.

Facilities
The school has 3 stories and facilities include a swimming pool, tennis courts, sports hall, dance studio, science laboratories, technology workshops and music studios.

Curriculum 
Subjects offered in the first 3 years at the school are as follows:
English, Maths, Science, Drama, History, Geography, Religious Studies, a modern language (French or Spanish), Music, Physical Education and Dance, Art, Technology, Computing, Personal, Social & Health Education (PSHE) and Citizenship.

In year 9, students can choose the subjects which they'd like to pursue for GCSE level; years 10 and 11.

The following subjects are compulsory:
English language and literature
Mathematics
Science
Citizenship/RS

Whilst students have a choice from the following:
Art & Design
Business Studies
Catering
Dance
Drama & Theatre Arts
Food Technology
French
Geography
Graphics
History
PE
Resistant Materials
RS
Sociology
Spanish
Textiles
Art
Computing

Notable former pupils

 Marion King, President UK & Ireland of MasterCard UK from 2012 to October 2014, and Chief Executive from 2002 to 2011 of BACS
 Stephen Sweeney, Professor of Physics
 Nicky Wardley, Actress.  One of her best-known parts was in The Catherine Tate Show as Lauren Cooper's best friend Lisa Jackson, as well as other parts during the series. In November 2013 she appeared in the one-off 50th anniversary comedy homage The Five(ish) Doctors Reboot. In 2016 she was cast as Miss Brahms in the one-off special of Are You Being Served celebrating BBC Comedy
 Sharna Jackson, Children's Author.

References

External links 
Official Site
BBC Performance Results
E-Teach Profile

Secondary schools in Luton
Foundation schools in Luton